Fridrich Karl Kuczyński, another common spelling Fridrich Kuczyńsky (1914, Suczów - 1948 or February 22, 1949) – war criminal, national socialist, head of the department for Jews at the Special Plenipotentiary of Reichsfurer SS and Chief Police for Employment of Foreign Nationalities in the area of Zagłębie Dąbrowskie.  Participant, among others, in the selection on August 12, 1942, on the pitch of the Hakoach sports club in Będzin ghetto, when people who were later deported to extermination camp were selected.

For crimes committed during the occupation against the Jewish nation, responsible for some 100,000 victims, he was sentenced in 1948 by the District Court in Sosnowiec to death penalty .  The sentence was carried out by hanging.

Kuczynski was a member of the Organization Schmelt (Dienststelle Schmelt). 
The selections of Jews were carried out by officials from the Schmelt department, in particular by Friedrich Karl Kuczynski.  "Schmelt's office was represented with its own quarters in the Auschwitz concentration camp."

He always wore civilian clothes.

See also
Organization Schmelt
Hunt for the Jews

References 

Nazi war criminals
Poland in World War II
Collaboration with Nazi Germany‎
1914 births
1940s deaths
Year of death uncertain
World War II crimes in Poland
The Holocaust in Poland
Poland
Massacres in Poland